Thanks, Obama is an Internet meme both seriously and satirically used in regard to former U.S. President Barack Obama's policies.

History 

The saying first appeared in 2009 using the hashtag #thanksobama in a tweet about President Obama's policies. Three months later, it was used in a demotivational poster.

When the Republicans gained control of the House in the U.S. midterm election of 2010, the meme changed, no longer being used just by frustrated conservatives; a photo of a tired-looking Obama became the background for a meme that blamed Obama for all kinds of societal and economic ills. During that time, liberals took the meme up as well, in a satirical reversal.

One notable example came in 2012, when a picture of a man spilling food with the "Thanks Obama" caption was popular. In December 2012, the /r/thanksobama subreddit was started.

By 2015, it seemed the meme had run its course after Obama used it in a BuzzFeed video. Obama himself revived it in 2016, using it to poke fun at his critics and to thank a supporter who, during a speech, yelled out at and thanked him for $2 gas.

On January 19, 2017, episode of The Late Show with Stephen Colbert, Obama's last full day in office, Stephen Colbert's original conservative character from The Colbert Report used the phrase to express gratitude to Obama for helping the Republican Party find a message of united opposition against him and succeed electorally again, only to later plead in fear for Obama to stay in office.

See also 
 Let's Go Brandon – slogan which similarly gained popular use through viral memes to protest or praise the presidency of Joe Biden

References 

2009 neologisms
Barack Obama controversies
Internet memes introduced in 2009
Political Internet memes